The School of Engineering of Juiz de Fora was an engineering college in the city of Juiz de Fora, Brazil. It is now the engineering faculty of the Federal University of Juiz de Fora (UFJF). The former president of Brazil Itamar Franco was an alumnus.

It was set up in 1914 in the city of Juiz de Fora, Minas Gerais state, Brazil, and taught a five-year course of Civil and Eletrotechnic Engineering. In 1960, the school joined the Medicine, Pharmacy and Law schools of that city to found the UFJF.

Nowadays, the Faculty of Engineering provides courses in civil, production, electrical (divided into telecommunication, energy, power, electronic, robotic and automation systems), mechanical, computer, sanitary and environmental engineering, and architecture.

External links
UFJF web site

Engineering universities and colleges in Brazil
Educational institutions established in 1914
1914 establishments in Brazil